A Nice Girl Like Me is a 1969 British comedy film directed by Desmond Davis.

Plot
The plot revolves around a girl who lives with her shrewd aunts, goes on a trip, gets pregnant, and must lie to her aunts that the baby is not hers.

Cast
 Barbara Ferris as Candida
 Harry Andrews as Savage, Caretaker
 Gladys Cooper as Aunt Mary
 William Hinnant as Ed
 James Villiers as Freddie
 Joyce Carey as Aunt Celia
 Christopher Guinee as Pierre
 Fabia Drake as Miss Grimsby
 Irene Prador as Mme. Dupont
 Erik Chitty as Vicar
 Totti Truman Taylor as Miss Charter
 John Serret as Museum Attendant
 John Clive as Supermarket Shopper
 Ann Lancaster as Miss Garland
 Shelagh Wilcocks as Labour Ward Sister
 Susan Whitman as Labour Ward Nurse
 Douglas Wilmer as Postnatal Clinic Doctor
 Jane Kenealy as baby

Production
In May 1967 Stanley Baker said he was going to produce and star in the movie alongside Hayley Mills. Filming was to begin in August.

By May 1968 the film was going to star Barbara Ferris and be directed by Desmond Davis. Ferris had enjoyed a hit on Broadway in There's a Girl in My Soup.Filming began July 1968.

It was shot on location in Paris, Venice and London around Chiswick and Hammersmith riverside. The film was originally meant to star Stanley Baker.

In July 1968 it was going to star Michael J Pollard and Barbara Ferris.

Critical reception
The Spinning Image wrote, "it was regarded at the time as a glossy exercise in marrying cinema advert visuals to a would-be daring plot about unmarried motherhood, some way away from the nineteen-sixties "issue" films and TV plays that offered audiences and commentators alike something to get their teeth into. Cathy Come Home or Up the Junction this was not. All that said, and those naysayers did have a point, funnily enough this has aged rather better than might have been expected since it conforms to the Swinging Sixties stereotype fairly comfortably; though it remained a shade artificial as an experience as a nostalgia piece it came across very well, and much of that was down to the central relationship."

References

External links

1969 films
1969 comedy films
British comedy films
Films scored by Patrick Williams
Films directed by Desmond Davis
British pregnancy films
Films based on British novels
Films set in London
Films set in Paris
Films shot in London
Embassy Pictures films
1960s English-language films
1960s British films